Al-Chibayish District is a district of the Dhi Qar Governorate, Iraq, located to the east of Nasiriyah and northwest of Basra Governorate. The district capital is Al-Chibayish. The district's geography is dominated by the Hammar Marshes, a subset of the Mesopotamian Marshes, and by the Euphrates River that feeds the marshes.

References

Districts of Dhi Qar Province